Georges-Alfred de La Bouglise (*25 April 1842 in Auteuil (Seine) – 1 December 1907 in Paris) was a French mining engineer who as a student played an important role in the gestation of the front-cranked velocipede named Michaux'.

At École Impériale Centrale des Arts et Manufactures in Paris Bouglise was befriended by Aimé and René Olivier de Sanderval, who as entrepreneurs later became associated with Pierre Michaux as "Michaux et Cie". In 1865 student Bouglise applied for exhibiting a two-wheeled velocipede at the Paris World Fair in 1867, but was declined. Bouglise left the school and as a technical mastermind designed the production machinery at the company. In 1868 he returned to Ècole Impériale and finished his brevet.

In his later life Bouglise owned and was vice president of Société Anonyme des Mines that operated the Lexington Mine near Butte, Montana.

Further reading
Keizo Kobayashi: Histoire du Vélocipède de Drais à Michaux 1827-1970 - Mythes et réalités,Tokyo 1993
H. E. Lessing: Balancing while Cranking was new in 1865, not the Crank - an heretical view. The Boneshaker'' #174, Summer 2007, pp. 12-15

1842 births
1907 deaths
French engineers